Churchill Square is the principal shopping centre in the centre of Brighton and Hove, a city on the south coast of England. It is at the eastern end of Western Road, near the Clock Tower.

Owned by Standard Life Investments, in common with the Brent Cross Shopping Centre in London, Churchill Square has up to 85 shops (when all are let), in addition to several sites for "open-air" style stalls in the corridors. It is arranged over three floors with only the food court on the uppermost; some of the largest stores occupy two floors. The majority of the shops are chain stores, typical of many other large British shopping centres. Additionally, on the outside piazza there are several food vans.

History
It was originally built during the 1960s by the architects Russell Diplock & Associates, obscuring several streets. That original centre included low-rise office blocks, a high-rise residential tower (Chartwell Court), shops and a supermarket with open but covered walkways between them. It was majorly rebuilt as an indoor mall, but without the low-rise office blocks. The new centre, which opened in 1998, involved further road closures and changes to the underlying street layout.

In 2023, it was announced that the former Topshop store, which had been closed since 2021, would be turned into a huge food and drinks venue for almost 500 people called The Botanist, part of a national chain of more than 30 gastropubs. As well as a new shopfront and changes to the internal layout, the venue is expected to have outdoor seating on the roof.

Access
Churchill Square is accessible by bus (it is on multiple bus routes), or a five- to ten-minute walk from Brighton station, or by car (there are two car parks; the Orange car park located on the lower levels of the centre, the entrance to which is located on Regency Road off of West Street, and the Green car park on the side of the centre, the entrance to which is located on Cannon Place), or by taxi (there is a small taxi rank in Queen Square on the other side of Western Road).

Redevelopment and extension
As part of the redevelopment of the adjacent Brighton Centre events venue, an extra floor will be added. Churchill Square will then connect directly with the Brighton Centre, the adjacent Odeon Cinema, and additional car parking, with a direct walkway from the centre to the sea front.

Anchors
 Debenhams. Debenhams was one of the major anchor stores from 1998 until its collapse in 2021. As of March 2023, the lot remains empty.
 British Home Stores (BHS). BHS was one of the major anchor stores until its collapse in 2016. Its lot was replaced by Zara, which is not an anchor.
 Topshop. Topshop was one of the major anchor stores from 2014 until its collapse in 2021.

References

External links
 Churchill Square old and new on the "My Brighton & Hove" website
 Official store guide (2022) 

Buildings and structures in Brighton and Hove
Shopping centres in East Sussex